Grey Nuns Motherhouse, now known as the Grey Nuns Building, is a former motherhouse of the Grey Nuns located at 1190 Guy Street, in the Borough of Ville-Marie, Montréal, Quebec, Canada. It is also named Grey Nuns Hospital of Montréal (not to be confused with Grey Nuns' Hospital located south of Place d'Youville). The building was completed in 1871.

In 2007, it was bought by Concordia University and refurbished. It now serves as co-ed housing for 598 undergraduate students on the Sir George Williams Campus within the neighbourhood redevelopment project Quartier Concordia.

A crypt containing the graves of 276 nuns and other individuals is located in the basement. Among them was Mother Marie-Marguerite d'Youville, the first native-born Canadian to be declared a saint. In 2010 her remains were removed and relocated to her 1701 birthplace of Varennes, a community on the South Shore.

In 2011, it was designated one of the National Historic Sites of Canada.

History

The building was constructed in the nineteenth century to serve as a motherhouse for the Sisters of Charity of Montreal, formerly called The Sisters of Charity of the Hôpital Général of Montreal and more commonly known as the Grey Nuns of Montreal, a Canadian religious institute of Roman Catholic religious sisters, founded in 1737 by Saint Marguerite d'Youville.

Construction
Individuals involved in the design and construction include:
Alcibiade Leporhon, architect
Joseph Venne, architect
Victor Bourgeau, architect
Maurice Perrault and Albert Ménard, architect
Alphonse Piché, architect
Maurice Payette, architect
Albert Deschamps, engineer

Description

The site is rectangular, bordered by Rene Levesque Boulevard at the south, Guy Street at the east, St. Catherine Street at the north, and Saint Mathieu at the west. It is enclosed with stone walls and metal fencing. Within this area are a main, large, H-shaped building of stone construction, various smaller buildings, and grounds containing numerous trees, gardens, statues, and pathways.

The architectural style is a superb example of convent architecture of the 19th century. This is achieved by combining Neoclassical and Romanesque Revival styles.

The main building has an H-shape, is large, and of stone construction. It is 4 storeys tall, with the exception of the west wing, which is 5 storeys tall. Its central part is rectangular and contains a chapel with an octagonal tower and spire. The windows and dormers are regularly placed.

As a Concordia student residence
Now called the Grey Nuns Building by Concordia University, the site has become a student residence. In 2007, it was bought by Concordia  for $18 million and refurbished for $15 million. The university initially announced that it would become the faculty of fine arts, but later decided to turn the site into residences. It serves as co-ed housing for 598 undergraduate students on the Sir George Williams Campus within the neighbourhood redevelopment project Quartier Concordia. The entire site is owned by Concordia except for a basement crypt.

The main entrance that was once on St-Mathieu Street is now located on Guy Street. The renovations undertaken have made space available for 355 new beds for resident students. There is a total of nearly 600 residence beds. The chapel has become a reading room that can accommodate 230 students. There are 14 group study rooms, a daycare facility, and a cafeteria area allowing resident students the choice of preparing meals.

Crypt

In the basement there is a crypt in which 276 people are buried, 232 of whom were Grey Nuns who had lived at the motherhouse. It is held in trust for the sisters, who are permitted to enter it. The crypt it is off limits to students and others, but can be viewed through a window in a locked door.

Originally, there were plans to transfer all of the buried remains to Île St. Bernard, a site owned by the Grey Nuns and the location of Manoir d’Youville. However, the health department of Quebec would not permit the tombs to be opened and the bodies exhumed. This was because some of the sisters buried there had died of infectious diseases.

Among the buried are the nieces and a son of Mother Marie-Marguerite d'Youville. In 2010, the remains of d'Youville were removed and transferred to her birthplace of Varennes for burial.

Gallery

References

External links

Press kit for Grey Nuns Unveiling
 Grey Nuns residence webpage at the Concordia University website

1871 establishments in Canada
Buildings and structures completed in 1871
Concordia University buildings and structures
Convents in Canada
National Historic Sites in Quebec
Tourist attractions in Montreal
University residences in Canada
19th-century religious buildings and structures in Canada